Gansevoort is a hamlet in the town of Northumberland in Saratoga County, New York, United States. The hamlet of Gansevoort is named for Peter Gansevoort, a hero in the siege of Fort Stanwix (Fort Schuyler) which contributed to the downfall of Burgoyne's army at the Battle of Saratoga during the Revolutionary War.

History
Gansevoort was originally settled by the Mohawk and Iroquois Indians and many burial mounds and artifacts from this time can still be found in the area.  White settlers moved in around the 1760s, brought in following military and hunting camps. The hamlet was an important stop on the Underground Railroad, given its proximity to Canada.

The Dutch Reformed Church of Gansevoort and Gansevoort Mansion are listed on the National Register of Historic Places.

Demographics 
No census data is available for the hamlet of Gansevoort.

References

Hamlets in New York (state)
Hamlets in Saratoga County, New York
Populated places on the Underground Railroad